CMSE may refer to:

CMSE (company), an Irish health and safety company
China Manned Space Engineering, the department in charge of China's manned spaceflight program
Compañía Minera San Esteban Primera, a Chilean mining company
Southeastern Military Command (Comando Militar do Sudeste), a Brazilian Army military command
The Center for Mathematics & Science Education, part of the Texas A&M College of Science
Clinique et Maternité Saint-Élisabeth de Namur, a department of the CHU UCLouvain Namur